Tucinyah  is a remote civil parish of Mootwingee County in far North West New South Wales.
The parish has a Köppen climate classification of BWh (hot desert).

References

Parishes of Mootwingee County
Far West (New South Wales)